Giuseppe Busillo (born May 13, 1970) is a former professional ice hockey player. Busillo represented Italy in the 1998 and 2006 Winter Olympics.

Career statistics

Regular season and playoffs

International

References

External links

1970 births
Living people
Canadian ice hockey left wingers
Eisbären Berlin players
HC Alleghe players
HC Varese players
Ice hockey people from Toronto
Ice hockey players at the 1998 Winter Olympics
Ice hockey players at the 2006 Winter Olympics
Kölner Haie players
Manchester Storm (1995–2002) players
Olympic ice hockey players of Italy
Oshawa Generals players
Sault Ste. Marie Greyhounds players
Schwenninger Wild Wings players
Canadian expatriate ice hockey players in England
Canadian expatriate ice hockey players in Italy
Canadian expatriate ice hockey players in Germany